Parents is a British sitcom starring Sally Phillips as Jenny Pope, a middle-class woman in her forties who moves, along with her husband and their teenage son and daughter, from London, to live with her parents in Kettering. The show ran for one series, broadcast on Sky 1 from 6 July to 3 August 2012. On 5 March 2013, Sky confirmed that Parents would not return for a second series.

Cast
 Sally Phillips as Jenny Pope
 Darren Strange as Nick Pope
 Tom Conti as Len Miller
 Susie Blake as Alma Miller
 Jadie Rose Hobson as Becky Pope
 Christian Lees as Sam Pope

Episodes

DVD release
The complete series was released on DVD on 29 July 2013 by Channel 4 DVD.

Reception
The show was met with a generally positive critical response, becoming increasingly positive throughout its run. The Independent called it "a broad family comedy, both funny and 'now'". Heat Magazine described the first episode as "good fun" whilst The Telegraph said it "shows some promise and boasts a good cast" and praised the writing, saying "the script is sharp, zeitgeisty, and just the right side of cloying". The Guardian was more critical of episode one, saying it "fails to make the leap from paper to screen" but responded much more positively to subsequent episodes, calling the show "an utter pleasure" and "beautifully written". The Mirror also praised the series, calling it "very funny" and saying that "as well as a great cast, Parents also has a great big heart and it's this that could keep it beating into further series".

References

External links

2012 British television series debuts
2012 British television series endings
2010s British sitcoms
English-language television shows
Kettering
Sky sitcoms
Television series about families
Television series by All3Media
Television shows set in Northamptonshire